Alison is a 2016 South African documentary film directed, written and produced by Uga Carlini. The film is based on the real life abduction, rape, stabbings, abandonment and then survival of Alison Botha in 1994. Botha appears as her older self. The film premiered at the Dances with Films Festival in 2016.

Premise
The documentary is based on the Marianne Thamm book, I Have Life, published by Penguin Random House. Alison is a triumphant, deeply personal and fairytale-like account of a woman who, after enduring a horrific incident in which she is raped, stabbed and disemboweled, refuses to become a victim. Through her survival spirit, she is able to transform trauma into a personal liberation that has rippling effects on all who meet, hear and see her. Very much her own hero, her tale is one of the relentless nature of trauma and the constant struggle to keep it at bay. Built around intimate interview sessions, this is a story of monsters, miracles and hope in the new South Africa.

Cast
 Alison Botha as herself
 Christia Visser as Young Alison

Accolades

References

External links
 
 
 Alison on Letterboxd.com

2016 films
South African documentary films
2016 documentary films